Elachorbis subtatei is a minute sea snail, a marine gastropod mollusc in the family Tornidae. It is known only from New Zealand.

References

 Powell A. W. B., New Zealand Mollusca, William Collins Publishers Ltd, Auckland, New Zealand 1979 

Tornidae
Gastropods of New Zealand
Gastropods described in 1907